Florence King (June 22, 1870–June 20, 1924) was the first female patent attorney in America.

Early life and education 
King earned a B.A. from Mount Morris College in 1891 and a law degree from Chicago-Kent College of Law in 1895.

Career 
King became the first woman registered to practice before the U.S. Patent Office in 1897, became the first woman to argue a patent case before the U.S. Supreme Court in 1922, and became the first woman to win a case before the U.S. Supreme Court in 1923 (Crown v. Nye).

She also worked as a consulting engineer in machine design and construction, having attended Armour Institute of Technology for three years.

She founded and served as president of the Women's Association of Commerce of Chicago and the Woman's Association of Commerce of the United States. She also organized the Woman's Alaska Gold Club.

She lived in Edison Park, Chicago. She died of breast cancer.

References

Mount Morris College alumni
American patent attorneys
American women engineers
1870 births
1924 deaths
19th-century American engineers
20th-century American engineers
Deaths from breast cancer
Deaths from cancer in Illinois
Chicago-Kent College of Law alumni
Engineers from Alaska
19th-century women engineers
20th-century women engineers
19th-century American lawyers
20th-century American lawyers
20th-century American women lawyers
19th-century American women lawyers